__NoTOC__
The 1946 Australian referendum was held on 28 September 1946. It contained three referendum questions.

The referendum was held in conjunction with the 1946 federal election.

Results in detail

Social Services
This section is an excerpt from 1946 Australian referendum (Social Services) § Results

Marketing
This section is an excerpt from 1946 Australian referendum (Marketing) § Results

Industrial Employment
This section is an excerpt from 1946 Australian referendum (Industrial Employment) § Results

See also
 Referendums in Australia
Politics of Australia
History of Australia

References

Further reading
  
 .
 Australian Electoral Commission (2007) Referendum Dates and Results 1906 – Present AEC, Canberra.

1946 referendums
1946
Referendum
September 1946 events in Australia
Aftermath of World War II in Australia